The Downtown Thermopolis Historic District comprises the central business district of Thermopolis, Wyoming. The district comprises the main street, Broadway, and Fifth Street.  The buildings lining the street were built between 1898 and 1923 in styles ranging from adaptations of commercial style to Victorian. The town was planned as a unit in 1896 after the land was acquired from the Shoshone and Arapaho. Broadway, as implied by its name, was built wide enough to accommodate teams of 16 mules or horses.

The Downtown Thermopolis Historic District was listed on the National Register of Historic Places in 1984, with a boundary increase in 2022.

References

External links
 Downtown Thermopolis Historic District at the Wyoming State Historic Preservation Office

Geography of Hot Springs County, Wyoming
Historic districts on the National Register of Historic Places in Wyoming
National Register of Historic Places in Hot Springs County, Wyoming